Ivan Hedqvist (8 June 1880 – 23 August 1935) was a Swedish stage and film actor. He also directed four silent films.

Selected filmography
 Johan Ulfstjerna (1923)
 Life in the Country (1924)
 Ingmar's Inheritance (1925)
 Uncle Frans (1926)
 Only a Dancing Girl (1926)
 She Is the Only One (1926)
 To the Orient (1926)
 A Sister of Six (1926)
 Sin (1928)
The Doctor's Secret (1930)
 The Two of Us (1930)

References

Bibliography
 Tommy Gustafsson. Masculinity in the Golden Age of Swedish Cinema: A Cultural Analysis of 1920s Films. McFarland, 2014.

External links

1880 births
1935 deaths
Swedish film directors
Swedish male film actors
Swedish male silent film actors
Swedish male stage actors
People from Uppland
20th-century Swedish male actors